Kerger is a surname. Notable people with the surname include:

Camille Kerger (born 1957), Luxembourgish composer, opera singer, and music teacher
Kevin Kerger (born 1994), Luxembourgish footballer

See also
Kerber (surname)